The Taconic Crest Trail is a  hiking trail in the Taconic Mountains in the northeastern United States. Much of the route has been conserved as state forest, conservation easement, or forest preserve.

Forest types on the Taconic Crest Trail are mixed oak-hickory forest and northern hardwood forest with microclimate summit balds, alkaline-loving plant communities, and red spruce/ balsam fir stands on the higher summits. The geology is thrust faulted metamorphic rock over younger sedimentary rock.

The Taconic Crest Trail passes through the New York towns of Stephentown, Berlin and Petersburgh; the Massachusetts towns of Hancock and Williamstown; and Pownal, Vermont. It is crossed by New York Route 2, Massachusetts Route 43, the seasonal Pittsfield State Forest Berry Pond Campground access road, and by Lebanon Springs Road in Hancock. The trail is supported by the New York State Department of Environmental Conservation (NYSDEC), the Taconic Hiking Club, the Trust for Public Land, the National Park Service, Williams College, Rensselaer Land Trust, the Massachusetts Department of Conservation and Recreation, and the Williamstown Rural Lands Foundation.

Trail details

The trail utilizes two distinct ridgelines of the Taconic Mountains. From Route 20 north, the trail passes through Pittsfield State Forest in Massachusetts; features include the highland Cranberry Pond and Twin Ponds, Doll Mountain, Smith Mountain, Tower Mountain, and Berry Pond, reputedly the highest pond in Massachusetts. A state campground is located at Berry Pond.

From Berry Pond, the trail descends the ridgeline into the village of Hancock, Massachusetts, then ascends the second ridge, which straddles the New York border. Features along this section include Rounds Mountain, Misery Mountain, Berlin Mountain (the trail's high point), Mount Raimer, White Rock, and a crevasse called the Snow Hole where ice has been known to persist year round. The trail utilizes conservation land and easements including the Taconic Ridge State Forest (NYSDEC) and  Hopkins Memorial Forest, owned and managed by Williams College.

The trail is marked with blue squares containing white blazes throughout its length. All NYSDEC portions of the trail are also posted with blue DEC markers. The trail follows a series of high, open summits and ridgeline overlooking the Hudson River Valley to the west. The entirety of the trail is open to hiking, backpacking, snowshoeing, cross-country skiing, and backcountry skiing, and many sections permit mountain biking, horseback riding and snowmobiling as well. Overnight camping is allowed on the trail; a seasonal campground with facilities is located at Berry Pond.

The Taconic Crest Trail originally extended  from Berry Pond in Pittsfield State Forest to North Pownal, Vermont. To the north, in Vermont, the Taconic Crest Trail once extended into North Pownal, but was closed by request of a property owner; the trail terminus was re-routed north to a newly constructed DEC trailhead at NY Route 346 in North Petersburgh, New York. Not visible from the road, the new trailhead shares a driveway with a private residence and with an old, barred forest road, which are visible; box 25, on the south side of 346, marks the trailhead entrance. A NYSDEC access trail, marked yellow, still leads down to the former terminus of the trail, at the old Prosser Hollow trailhead.

See also
Appalachian Trail
Taconic Trails

References

Massachusetts Trail Guide (2004). Boston: Appalachian Mountain Club.
Commonwealth Connections proposal PDF download. Retrieved March 2, 2008.
AMC Massachusetts and Rhode Island Trail Guide (1989). Boston: Appalachian Mountain Club.
Taconic Crest Project. Rensselaer Land Trust. Retrieved March 2, 2008.

External links
 http://www.dec.ny.gov/about/650.html
 http://www.dec.ny.gov/about/625.html
 http://www.dec.ny.gov/about/621.html
Berkshire Natural Resource Council.
Rensselaer Land Trust.
Pittsfield State Forest map
Pittsfield State Forest. Massachusetts DCR.
Hopkins Memorial Forest map.
Hopkins Memorial Forest history
Taconic Hiking Club
Williamstown Rural Lands Foundation
Williamstown Rural Lands Foundation trail map

Protected areas of Bennington County, Vermont
Protected areas of Berkshire County, Massachusetts
Hiking trails in Massachusetts
Hiking trails in New York (state)
Hiking trails in Vermont
Taconic Mountains
Protected areas of Rensselaer County, New York